is a city in Aichi Prefecture, Japan. , the city had an estimated population of 188,693 in 76,087 households, and a population density of 2,193 persons per km².

Geography

National Route 1 and National Route 23 provide the main east-west access through the city, with Aichi Prefectural Route 48 running between the two.

Climate
The city has a climate characterized by hot and humid summers, and relatively mild winters (Köppen climate classification Cfa).  The average annual temperature in Anjō is 15.6 °C. The average annual rainfall is 1576 mm with September as the wettest month. The temperatures are highest on average in August, at around 27.7 °C, and lowest in January, at around 4.4 °C.

Demographics
Per Japanese census data, the population of Anjō has grown rapidly over the past 70 years.

Neighboring municipalities
Aichi Prefecture
Okazaki
Hekinan
Takahama
Kariya
Toyota
Chiryū
Nishio

History

Origins
The area of present-day Anjō has been continuously occupied since preshistoric times.  Archaeologists have found numerous remains from the Japanese Paleolithic period and burial mounds from the Kofun period.

Ancient history
During the Nara period, the area was assigned to ancient Hekikai County, and was divided into several shōen during the Heian period, largely under the control of the Fujiwara clan or the Taira clan.

Middle Ages
However, in the Kamakura period, parts of the territory came under the control of the Jōdo Shinshū sect, who challenged the secular authority of the various samurai clans, most notably the Matsudaira clan. 

During the Sengoku period, numerous fortifications were erected in the area.

Early modern period
Tokugawa Ieyasu unified the region and destroyed the power of the Jōdo Shinshū sect in the Battle of Azukizaka (1564).  During the Edo period, half of present-day Anjō was controlled by Okazaki Domain and the other half by Kariya Domain under the Tokugawa shogunate with some scattered portions of tenryō territory ruled directly by the shogunate. During this period, the area was noted for its production of cotton and textiles.

Late modern period
At the start of the Meiji period, on October 1, 1889, Anjō was one of a collection of villages organized within Hekikai District, Aichi Prefecture by the establishment of the modern municipalities system,.
It was elevated to town status on May 1, 1906.
The opening of the Meiji Irrigation Canal transformed the area in the 1920s and 1930s into one of the most agriculturally productive regions of the period, sparking the comparison with Denmark, then regarded the most highly advanced agricultural nation in the world.

Contemporary history
Anjō was elevated to city status on May 3, 1952.
On April 1, 1967, it annexed the neighboring town of Sakurai.

Government

Anjō has a mayor-council form of government with a directly elected mayor and a unicameral city legislature of 28 members. The city contributes two members to the Aichi Prefectural Assembly.  In terms of national politics, the city is part of Aichi District 13 of the lower house of the Diet of Japan.

Economy
Anjō is a regional commercial center with a mixed economy of manufacturing and agriculture.

Primary sector of the economy

Agriculture
In addition to rice, wheat, and soybeans, notable agricultural products include figs, Japanese pears, and cucumbers.

Secondary sector of the economy

Manufacturing
Due to its proximity to the various factories of Toyota in neighboring Toyota City, Anjō is host to many factories supplying components into the automobile industry.

Companies headquartered in Anjō
Makita, power tools, founded in Anjō, 1915. 
Aisin AW, automotive components
Anden, automotive components
Central Motor Wheel, automotive components
Hekikai Shinkin Bank
Sugi Holdings, pharmaceuticals
Tosho Holdings, real estate

Education

Schools
Primary and secondary education
Anjō has 21 public elementary schools and eight public middle schools operated by the city government. The city has four public high schools operated by the Aichi Prefectural Board of Education. In addition the prefecture operates one special education school for the handicapped.

International schools
Escola São Paulo – Brazilian school (Ensinos Fundamental e Médio)

Professional development school
Denso Technical Skills Academy

Transportation

Railways
The Tōkaidō Shinkansen stops at Mikawa-Anjō Station, but Anjō Station on the Tōkaidō Main Line and Shin-Anjō Station on the Meitetsu Nagoya Main Line and Nishio Line serve the commercial center of the city.

High-speed rail
 Central Japan Railway Company
Tōkaidō Shinkansen：-  –

Conventional lines
 Central Japan Railway Company
Tōkaidō Main Line：-  –  –
 Meitetsu
Nagoya Main Line：-  –
Nishio Line：-  –  –  –  –  –  –  –

Roads

Expressways
 Isewangan Expressway

Japan National Route

External relations

Twin towns – Sister cities

International
Huntington Beach（California, United States of America）
since July 4, 1992
Hobsons Bay（Victoria, Australia）
since October 15, 1994
Kolding（Southern Denmark, Denmark）
since January 21, 2009

Local attractions

Tourist attraction
National Historic Sites
Honshōji – Buddhist temple that was the site of the Battle of Azukizaka (1564)
Futago Kofun
Himeogawa Kofun
 Other historical sites
Anjō Castle – Site of Anjo Castle, built in 1480, destroyed in 1562
Anjō shrine
Meijigawa Shrine

Parks
Den Park
Horiuchi Park

Culture

Festival
Anjo Tanabata Festival

Sports

Notable people

Tohru Fukuyama, organic chemist
Tam Nakano (Real Name: Yuria Tauchi, Nihongo: 田内 友里愛, Tauchi Yuria), professional wrestler
Kazuchika Okada, professional wrestler
Ayumi Tanimoto, Olympic gold-medalist judo wrestler
Ryōka Yuzuki, voice actress
Goiti Yamauchi, Japanese Brazilian Mixed martial artist
Tsuneko Gauntlett, suffrage, and peace activist

References

External links 

 

Cities in Aichi Prefecture
Anjō, Aichi